Masood Fakhri (1932 – 6 September 2016) was a Pakistani professional footballer who played as a forward. A former Pakistani international, Fakhri was well known for his time with Indian Kolkata clubs East Bengal and Mohammedan. He also played in England with Bradford City before retiring.

Early life
Fakhri was born in 1932 in Toba Tek Singh, Punjab, In 1955 Saadat Hasan Manto’s highly-acclaimed short story Toba Tek Singh immortalised this town.

Club career

Early career
He began his career in his home country with Pakistan Raiders Club.

East Bengal
In 1952, when he moved to India, was a 20-year-old youngster and signed with Calcutta Football League side East Bengal. During his first season with the club Fakhri helped his side win the Calcutta Football League alongside the prestigious Durand Cup. Fakhri usually played as a left-winger and had scored 14 goals in the Calcutta Football League alongside scoring the winning goals in his first two matches against East Bengal's biggest rivals, Mohun Bagan, and thus became a fan favorite among East Bengal supporters. Fakhri helped the team winning the DCM Trophy and was also part of the East Bengal side to play tournament and friendly matches in Europe.

Fakhri went on to play for two more seasons at the club. In 1953, he was part of the senior team's tour to the Romanian Youth Festival in Bucharest, where they faced teams like FC Torpedo Moscow. He scored a goal against Lebanon XI in their 6–1 win in that tournament. He was also a part of the team that played against German side Kickers Offenbach in that year.

Mohammedan Sporting
In 1955, Fakhri signed with another Kolkata club, Mohammedan. In 1956, he helped Mohammedan winning the prestigious Rovers Cup title.

Bradford City
Bert Flatley, a coach with the Football Association (FA) in England, communicated to Fakhri the possibility of a move to Bradford City. The club then competed in the third tier of English football league system. After negotiations with the then manager Peter Jackson, Fakhri finally signed for the club on 8 August 1956 In 1956. After playing one season with the club, he prematurely quit football due to personal reasons in 1957.

International
Fakhri had represented Pakistan at international level in the preceding years. Fakhri had most notably scored a hat-trick and became the first player from Pakistan to do so as his national team thumped Singapore 6–2 in a group match at the 1954 Asian Games in Manila, Philippines. He had also scored goals against India and Myanmar during the period.

Personal life
Fakhri married Rhoda Eileen and lived in Llanrwst, North Wales. His brother's family settled in Great Britain as well.

Post-retirement
After retiring from football, Fakhri lived out the rest of his life living in Bangor Teifi, Wales.

He died in September 2016 in Wales.

Honours

East Bengal
Calcutta Football League: 1952
Durand Cup: 1952
Mohammedan Sporting
Rovers Cup: 1956

Pakistan
Colombo Quadrangular Cup: 1952; runner-up: 1953, 1955; third-place: 1954

See also
List of foreign players for SC East Bengal

References

Further reading

Chatterjee, Partha. The Nation and Its Fragments: Colonial and Post-colonial Histories (Calcutta: Oxford University Press, 1995).

External links

Profile: Masood Fakhri at Football Pakistan

1932 births
2016 deaths
People from Toba Tek Singh District
Punjabi people
Pakistani footballers
East Bengal Club players
Footballers from Punjab, Pakistan
Mohammedan SC (Kolkata) players
Bradford City A.F.C. players
Association football forwards
Calcutta Football League players
Pakistan international footballers
Pakistani expatriate footballers
Expatriate footballers in India
Expatriate footballers in England
Pakistani emigrants to Wales